Taqiabad (also Romanized as Taqīābād) is a village in Ravar Rural District, in the Central District of Ravar County, Kerman Province, Iran. At the 2006 census, its population was 772, in 193 families.

References 

Populated places in Ravar County